Robert Lawrence Hauck (born June 14, 1964) is an American college football coach. He is the head football coach at the University of Montana, a position he held from 2003 to 2009 and resumed before the 2018 season. Hauck was also the head football coach at the University of Nevada, Las Vegas (UNLV) from 2010 to 2014. During his first stint as head coach at Montana,  Hauck led the Grizzlies to seven Big Sky Conference titles and postseason berths in as many seasons, including three national championship game appearances. In 2013, following three losing seasons at UNLV, Hauck led the Rebels to their first winning season since 2000 only to backslide to 2-11 the following season leading to a buyout of his remaining contract and a negotiated resignation.

Early days
Hauck was born in Missoula, Montana, and was schooled at Sweet Grass County High School in Big Timber. His brother Tim was a star defensive back at Montana and went on to play 13 seasons in the National Football League (NFL).  Bobby did his higher studies at the University of Montana (1988) and UCLA (1991). Hauck never played football at the collegiate level, instead competing in track at Montana before getting into coaching.

Head coaching career

Montana
Hauck's first season as head coach of Montana was in 2003, and over the next seven seasons, the Griz won or shared seven straight Big Sky Conference championships. While never winning a national championship, he is the fourth coach to guide Montana to the FCS Championship game. He took the 2004 team to the NCAA Division I-AA national championship game and the 2006 team to the I-AA semifinals. In 2007, he signed a one-year contract, rejecting a three-year deal that he was offered. Montana lost the national championship game in 2008 and 2009.

UNLV
Hauck had been rumored as a candidate for the vacant head coaching position at UNLV in December 2009 and interviewed with UNLV's Athletic Director Jim Livengood on December 20, 2009.  On December 22, the Las Vegas Sun reported that Hauck would be named UNLV's next head coach after completing a second interview earlier that day.  Hauck and UNLV agreed on a three-year contract worth $350,000 annually in base pay.  Hauck can also earn up to $150,000 in completion bonuses that are heavy in incentives. UNLV announced on November 28, 2014 that Hauck had submitted his resignation to the team after going 15–48 in five seasons.

San Diego State
On January 16, 2015 Hauck was hired as the special teams coordinator for the San Diego State football team. In 2016, Hauck was promoted to associate head coach.

Return to Montana
Hauck returned to Montana during the 2018 season. After starting his first season 6-5, the Grizzlies improved to 10-4 the season after. During the shortened 2020 season, Hauck began 2-0 before the season was cut short.

On September 4th, 2021, Hauck and the Grizzlies defeated the #20-ranked Washington Huskies, marking the fifth time ever an FCS team has beat a ranked FBS team, and the first time since 2014 that Hauck had defeated an FBS team.

Head coaching record

Awards
 2006 Regional Coach of the Year Winner (Division I-AA, Region 5)
 Big Sky coach of the year 2006, 2007 and 2009.

Hauck was also one of the finalists of the 2006 Eddie Robinson Award.

References

External links
 Montana profile

1964 births
Living people
Colorado Buffaloes football coaches
Montana Grizzlies football coaches
Montana Grizzlies track and field athletes
Northern Arizona Lumberjacks football coaches
San Diego State Aztecs football coaches
UCLA Bruins football coaches
UNLV Rebels football coaches
Washington Huskies football coaches
University of California, Los Angeles alumni
People from Big Timber, Montana
Sportspeople from Missoula, Montana
Coaches of American football from Montana
Track and field athletes from Montana